Marc Touchais (born 21 March 1958) is a French gymnast. He competed in eight events at the 1980 Summer Olympics.

References

1958 births
Living people
French male artistic gymnasts
Olympic gymnasts of France
Gymnasts at the 1980 Summer Olympics
Place of birth missing (living people)
20th-century French people